Hybristophilia is a paraphilia involving sexual interest in and attraction to those who commit crimes.<ref>Hybristophilia definition, American Psychological Association</ref> The term is derived from the Greek word , meaning "to commit an outrage against someone" (ultimately derived from  , "hubris"), and philo, meaning "having a strong affinity/preference for".

Many high-profile criminals, particularly those who have committed atrocious crimes, receive "fan mail" in prison that is sometimes amorous or sexual, presumably as a result of this phenomenon. In some cases, admirers of these criminals have gone on to marry the object of their affections in prison. In popular culture, this phenomenon is also known as "Bonnie and Clyde syndrome".

Lexicology
The term is derived from the Greek word ὑβρίζειν hubrizein, meaning "to commit an outrage against someone" (ultimately derived from ὕβρις hubris "hubris"), and philo, meaning "having a strong affinity/preference for". In its broadest sense, hybristophilia includes attraction towards partners who displayed dark triad personality traits. In popular culture, this phenomenon is also known as "Bonnie and Clyde Syndrome".

 Causes 
Some speculations have been offered as to the cause of hybristophilia. Katherine Ramsland, a professor of forensic psychology at DeSales University, mentions that some of the women in particular who have married or dated male serial killers have offered the following reasons:
  Low self esteem and the lack of a father figure
 "Some believe they can change a man as cruel and powerful as a serial killer."
 "Others 'see' the little boy that the killer once was and seek to nurture him."
 "A few hoped to share in the media spotlight or get a book or movie deal."
 "Then there's the notion of the 'perfect boyfriend'. She knows where he is at all times and she knows he's thinking about her. While she can claim that someone loves her, she does not have to endure the day-to-day issues involved in most relationships. There’s no laundry to do, no cooking for him, and no accountability to him. She can keep the fantasy charged up for a long time."
Others offered reasons along the lines of:
 "Some mental health experts have compared infatuation with killers to extreme forms of fanaticism. They view such women as insecure females who cannot find love in normal ways or as 'love-avoidant' females who seek romantic relationships that cannot be consummated."

Psychologist Leon F. Seltzer has offered explanations for the phenomenon of male serial killers attracting female sex partners based on evolutionary psychology. Serial killers, in his view, are cases of alpha males that tend to attract women. This is because such males were good at protecting women and their offspring according to evolutionary history. He says women today may consciously realize that it is unwise to date a serial killer, but they are nevertheless attracted to them; he stated, "as a therapist I've encountered many women who bemoaned their vulnerability toward dominant men who, consciously, they recognized were all wrong for them". As evidence of women's fantasy preference for dominant men, he refers to the book A Billion Wicked Thoughts: What the World's Largest Experiment Reveals about Human Desire by Ogi Ogas and Sai Gaddam. Seltzer discusses Ogas and Gaddam's argument that this fantasy is the dominant plot of most erotic/romantic books and movies written for women but the fantasy always holds that this male dominance is conditional, "it doesn't really represent the man's innermost reality".

Women who write pen letters or even pursue men who are incarcerated for a crime are sometimes referred to as a prison groupie''.

Notable examples 
 One of the most infamous examples of hybristophilia is the large number of women attracted to Ted Bundy after his arrest. He often drew scores of women at the jammed courtrooms of his trials each day. Bundy allegedly received hundreds of love letters from women while he was incarcerated, and married a woman, Carole Ann Boone, whom he had met while working in Washington. He proposed to her in the middle of proceedings while Boone was on the witness stand. Boone gave birth to a daughter who it was believed Bundy had fathered.
 Jeffrey Dahmer, a serial killer, is said to have had amorous women sending him letters, money, and other gifts during his time in prison despite being a gay man.
 Richard Ramirez, the "Night Stalker" who killed 13 people and had "more than a passing interest" in Satanism, had fans who would write him letters and pay him visits. This included Doreen Lioy who married him in California's San Quentin State Prison on October 3, 1996.
 Charles Manson's groupies are also examples.
 Terrorists such as Anders Behring Breivik and Dzhokhar Tsarnaev have also been the objects of hybristophilia.
School shooters Eric Harris and Dylan Klebold have been posthumously subjected to hybristophilia.

References

Further reading

 
 
 
 
 

Human sexuality
Paraphilias
Sexual disorders
Sexual fetishism